Harold Vane Baumgartner (17 November 1883 – 8 April 1938), was a South African cricketer who was born in Henley-on-Thames, Oxfordshire, England, educated at Bedford School, and died in Accra, Gold Coast. He played in one Test in 1913.

References

1883 births
1938 deaths
People educated at Bedford School
South Africa Test cricketers
South African cricketers
Free State cricketers
Gauteng cricketers
People from Henley-on-Thames
Bedfordshire cricketers